Mitrodetus australis is a species of Brachycera from the Mydidae family. The scientific name of this species was first published in 1979 by Artigas & Palma.

This species is native to Argentina.

References

Mydidae
Arthropods of Argentina
Insects described in 1979